Corjova is a commune in Dubăsari District, Moldova. Located on the eastern bank of the River Dniester, it consists of two villages, Corjova and Mahala, with a total population of 3,231.

The Romanian language Mihai Eminescu Lyceum is located in Corjova village.

History 

During the Soviet period, it was considered a suburb of the nearby city of Dubăsari, but has since separated from the city and elects its own mayor. During the 1992 War of Transnistria the village was the scene of heavy fighting. After the war it was divided between a part controlled by the government of Moldova and a part controlled by the secessionist government of Transnistria.

On 13 May 2007, Transnistrian separatist authorities briefly detained Valeriu Mițul, the mayor of Corjova, and Iurie Coțofan, a Dubăsari district councillor. On 3 June 2007, Iurie Coțofan was again detained. Transnistrian militsiya (police force) did not allow the inhabitants to participate in Moldovan elections. Valentin Besleag, a candidate for mayoral office, was also detained by the separatist authorities on 2 June.

In February 2023. the mayor of the commune, Sergiu Oprea, said in an interview with Vocea Basarabiei that the work of local Moldovan police and attempts to organize a census of the population are restricted by Transnistrian authorities.

Population

Notable natives
Ion Creangă, Moldovan politician
Valeriu Mițul, anti-separatist activist, Mayor of Corjova
Timofei Moșneaga, Moldovan physician and Minister of Health
Isidor Sârbu, Romanian victim of Soviet repression, Mayor of Corjova
Nichita Smochină, Romanian scholar and political figure
Vladimir Voronin, 3rd President of Moldova

References

External links
Interview with Valeriu Mocan, counselor in Corjova

Communes of Dubăsari District